Melia, also known as Karion, was a town of ancient Ionia.

Its site is located at Kale Tepe, Güzelçamlı, Asiatic Turkey.

References

Populated places in ancient Ionia
Former populated places in Turkey